Maroon (US/UK  , Australia  ) is a  brownish   crimson  color that takes its name from the French word marron, or chestnut. "Marron" is also one of the French translations for "brown".

According to multiple dictionaries, there are variabilities in defining the color maroon. The Cambridge English Dictionary defines maroon as a dark reddish-purple color while its "American Dictionary" section defines maroon as dark brown-red. This suggests slight perceptual differences in the U.K. versus North America. Lexico online dictionary defines maroon as a brownish-red. Similarly, Dictionary.com defines maroon as a dark brownish-red. The Oxford English Dictionary describes maroon as "a brownish crimson (strong red) or claret (purple color)  color," while the Merriam-Webster online dictionary simply defines it as a dark red.

In the sRGB color model for additive color representation, the web color called maroon is created by turning down the brightness of pure red to about one half. It is also noted that maroon is the complement of the web color called teal.

Etymology 

Maroon is derived from French marron ("chestnut"), itself from the Italian marrone that means both chestnut and brown (but the color maroon in Italian is granata and in French is grenat), from the medieval Greek maraon.

The first recorded use of maroon as a color name in English was in 1789.

In culture 

Religion
 Vajrayana Buddhist monks, such as the Dalai Lama, wear maroon robes.
Maroon, along with golden yellow, is worn in the Philippines by Catholic devotees of the Black Nazarene, especially during its procession on 9 January.

National symbols
 Maroon and white are the colors of the Flag of Qatar.
 Flag of Phoenix is maroon and white.
 Maroon, gold, teal and orange are the colors of the Flag of Sri Lanka
 The Flag of Latvia has sometimes been called maroon and white, although the officially declared colors were red and white, and in 2009 were changed to carmine and white.
 Maroon was named as the official color of the state of Queensland, Australia, in November 2003. While the declared shade of maroon in sRGB is R=115, G=24, B=44, Queenslanders display the spirit of the state by wearing all shades of maroon at sporting and cultural events.

Politics
 Maroon is the color of the Dutch far-right political party Forum for Democracy.

Military
 The distinctive maroon beret has been worn by many airborne forces around the world since 1942. It is sometimes referred to as the "red beret." 
 Historically maroon was the distinguishing color of the Caçadores (rifle) regiments of the Portuguese Army.

Business
 Maroon is the signature color of the Japanese private rail company, Hankyu Railway, decided by a vote of women customers in 1923. In the 1990s, Hankyu planned an alternative color as it was developing new vehicles. That plan was called off following opposition by local residents

Music
 The Famous Maroon Band
 Maroon 5
 Maroon by Taylor Swift

School colors

Many universities, colleges, high schools and other educational institutions have maroon as one of their school colors. Popular combinations include maroon and white, maroon and grey,  maroon and gold, and maroon and blue.

 Maroon and White are the official school colors of Texas A&M University.
 Maroon and Gold are the official school colors of Texas State University
 Maroon and Gold are the official school colors of Boston College.
 Maroon and Gold are the official school colors of the University of Minnesota.
 Maroon and Gold are the official school colors of the Central Michigan University.
 Maroon and Gold are the official school colors of Shimer College, representing Mount Carroll Seminary.
 Maroon is the official school color of the University of Chicago. The school also employs light and dark gray in its official primary color palette.
 Maroon and White are the official school colors of Lower Merion High School.
 Maroon and White are the official school colors of Mississippi State University and the name of the university's alma mater.
 Maroon and White are the official school colors of Colgate University.
 Maroon and White are the official school colors of Missouri State University.
 Maroon and White are the official school colors of Southern Illinois University Carbondale.
 Maroon and Gold are the official school colors of Arizona State University and the name of the university's fight song.
 Maroon and Black are the official school colors of Cumberland University.
 Maroon and Orange are the official school colors of Virginia Tech.
 Maroon and Blue are the official colors of Port Rex Technical High School in South Africa.
 Maroon and Forest Green are the primary and complementary institutional colors of the University of the Philippines System.

 Maroon and Gold are the school colors of the University of Perpetual Help System DALTA in the Philippines.

Sports

Sports teams often use maroon as one of their identifying colors, as a result, many have received the nickname "Maroons."
 The University of Chicago Maroons have used the nickname (and the corresponding color) since a vote came at a meeting of students and faculty on May 5, 1894.
 The University of the Philippines Fighting Maroons competes in the University Athletic Association of the Philippines and is based in their Diliman Campus. The moniker has been associated with their teams since the 1930s, except for a brief period in the 1960s when they were known as the Parrots.
 The University of Perpetual Help Altas, playing in the National Collegiate Athletic Association (Philippines) use the color as their primary uniform, derived from their school colors .
 Heart of Midlothian F.C. have played in predominantly maroon colours since 1877, although they had maroon badge and trimmings in their first kit from their formation in 1874.
 Official colour of Italian association football team Torino_F.C. Club's fans are known as I Granata (the Maroons in italian).
 Official colour of Argentina's association football team Club_Atl%C3%A9tico_Lan%C3%BAs (Los Granates).
 Maroons was the official nickname of the athletic teams representing Mississippi State College, now Mississippi State University from 1932 until 1961 when it was officially changed to the Bulldogs.  Bulldogs had been used as an unofficial nickname as far back as 1905.
 Maroons is also the common nickname for the Queensland Rugby League team when it plays against the Blues (the New South Welshmen) in an annual competition of three games known as the State of Origin series in Australia.
 West Indies cricket team wears all maroon clothing in limited-overs cricket whilst in Test cricket, they wear maroon cricket caps.
 In pool, the color of the 7 and 15 billiard balls are traditionally maroon.

Commercial variations of maroon

Maroon (Crayola) 

The color designated as maroon in Crayola crayons since 1949 is a bright medium shade of maroon halfway between brown and rose.

Rich maroon (maroon (X11)) 

Displayed in the adjacent table is the color rich maroon, i.e. maroon as defined in the X11 color names, which is much brighter and more toned toward rose than the HTML/CSS maroon shown above.

See the chart Color name clashes in the X11 color names article to see those colors that are different in HTML/CSS and X11.

Dark red

Displayed in the adjacent table is the web color dark red.

UP maroon 

UP Maroon is the shade used by the University of the Philippines as its primary color.

See also 
 List of colors

References

External links 
 
 

Shades of brown
Shades of red
Web colors